Libertas.cz is a eurosceptic party in the Czech Republic that was founded in 2009 by the former media entrepreneur and MEP Vladimír Železný. After some controversies it became an associate of Declan Ganley's pan-European alliance Libertas.eu.

History 
After comprehensive negotiations with president Václav Klaus and other leading Czech eurosceptics, Ganley's attempts to bring about a Czech branch of Libertas.eu remained unsuccessful. The newly founded Party of Free Citizens, which was endorsed by Klaus, unexpectedly refused to cooperate with Ganley's pan-European alliance, leaving the name Libertas unclaimed in the Czech Republic.

This enabled the former media mogul Vladimír Železný, a eurosceptic Member of the European Parliament to register a party under exactly the designated name by January 21, 2009. It remained unclear whether the registration had been accomplished in some way on behalf of the European Libertas.eu or without any consent.

Supporters of Železný's Libertas.cz included Jana Bobošíková and Vlastimil Tlustý but not Declan Ganley and his followers, who promptly disavowed the party. However, after Václav Klaus intervened, two MPs, Vlastimil Tlustý and Jan Schwippel, changed sides, leaving ODS and joining Železný's Libertas.cz. This led the European Libertas.eu to a volte-face, now claiming Železný's Libertas.cz an affiliate.

2009 European Parliament elections 

The list fielded by Libertas.cz in the 2009 European Parliament elections contained the following 29 candidates:

The list contained the nineteen candidates from Železný's other party (Nezávislí demokraté), six independents (including Jan Schwippel, now disavowed ODS), one ODS (Vlastimil Tlustý), and three other candidates.

The number of candidates elected was zero.

See also
 Treaty of Lisbon

External links
Official site
Vlastimil Tlustý - Libertas Ceska on YouTube.

References

Eurosceptic parties in the Czech Republic
Political parties established in 2009
Conservative parties in the Czech Republic
Libertas.eu
2009 establishments in the Czech Republic